The 2019 Walsall Metropolitan Borough Council election took place on 2 May 2019, to elect members of the Walsall Metropolitan Borough Council in England. It was held on the same day as other local elections. The Conservatives took control of the council

Results by Ward
Source:

Aldridge Central and South

Aldridge North and Walsall Wood

Bentley and Darlaston North

Birchills-Leamore

Blakenall

Bloxwich East

Bloxwich West

Brownhills

Darlaston South

Paddock

Palfrey

Pelsall

Pheasey Park Farm

Pleck

Rushall-Shelfield

St Matthew's

Short Heath

Streetly

Willenhall North

Willenhall South

References

Walsall
Walsall Council elections